Painting (Blue Star) is a 1927 painting by the Spanish artist Joan Miró. In June 2012, it sold at auction for £23.5 million, setting a new record for the highest price paid for a painting by Miró.

References

1927 paintings
Paintings by Joan Miró